Windber is a borough in Somerset County, Pennsylvania, United States, which is located approximately  south of Johnstown. At one time, it was a place of multiple industrial activities, including coal mining, lumbering, and the manufacture of fire brick.

The community was founded in 1897 by coal barons Charles and Edward Julius Berwind, owners of the Berwind Corporation; the name "Windber" simply switches the order of the two syllables in the family name "Berwind".

A total of 8,013 people lived in Windber in 1910 and the figure rose to 9,057 as of 1940; the population was 3,930 at the time of the 2020 census. 

It is part of the Johnstown, Pennsylvania Metropolitan Statistical Area.

History
Windber was established in 1897 as a company town for nearby coal mines in the vicinity of Johnstown. The Berwind-White Coal Mining Company imported workers from eastern and southern Europe and exploited ethnic divisions in the area (which had been settled by Germans and Irish in the 19th century).

On Good Friday 1922, coal miners walked out of the mines in Windber and several nearby locations in Somerset County, attempting to force the mine owners to recognize their United Mine Workers union, as well as accurately weigh the coal they mined. The company employed legal tactics (the United States Supreme Court decided two lawsuits) as well as strike-breakers, but the miners received considerable favorable national publicity and local support and held out until the end of the following summer. However, the UMW successfully organized the mines during 1933, after the Great Depression led to the election of President Franklin Delano Roosevelt.

The Vintage Electric Streetcar Company, popularly called the "trolley graveyard", is located in Windber. The private scrapyard houses a number of PCC streetcars and other transit equipment from systems like the MBTA Green Line, which are sold for reuse or scrapped for parts.

The Windber Historic District was listed on the National Register of Historic Places in 1991.

Geography
Windber is located at  (40.235161, -78.830864).

Demographics

As of the census of 2000, there were 4,395 people, 2,019 households, and 1,185 families residing in the borough.

The population density was 2,118.8 people per square mile (819.8/km2). There were 2,177 housing units at an average density of 1,049.5 per square mile (406.1/km2).

The racial makeup of the borough was 99.29% White, 0.07% Native American, 0.09% Asian, 0.02% Pacific Islander, 0.16% from other races, and 0.36% from two or more races. Hispanic or Latino of any race were 0.57% of the population.

There were 2,019 households, out of which 25.1% had children under the age of eighteen living with them; 43.3% were married couples living together, 10.8% had a female householder with no husband present, and 41.3% were non-families. 38.7% of all households were made up of individuals, and 22.6% had someone living alone who was sixty-five years of age or older.

The average household size was 2.16 and the average family size was 2.89.

In the borough the population was spread out, with 21.3% under the age of eighteen, 6.7% from eighteen to twenty-four, 25.3% from twenty-five to forty-four, 22.1% from forty-five to sixty-four, and 24.6% who were sixty-five years of age or older. The median age was forty-three years.

For every one hundred females, there were 85.4 males. For every one hundred females who were aged eighteen or older, there were 81.9 males.

The median income for a household in the borough was $23,261, and the median income for a family was $31,860. Males had a median income of $24,861 compared with that of $18,886 for females.

The per capita income for the borough was $15,078.

Roughly 11.9% of families and 11.1% of the population were living below the poverty line, including 13.5% of those who were under the age of eighteen and 8.8% of those who were aged sixty-five or older.

Crime
Windber has ranked safer than thirteen percent of small cities and towns in Pennsylvania.

Government 
Windber Borough Council:
 Mike Bryan, President of Council
 James Spinos, Vice President of Council
 John Holden
 Joe Pallo
 Doug Ledney
 Ron Mash
 Pete Lamonaca

Windber Borough Government Officials:
 Mike Thomas, Mayor
 Robin S. Gates, Borough Secretary/Administrative Assistant
 James Furmanchick, Borough Manager

Education 
 Windber Area School District
 Windber Area High School
 Windber Area Middle School
 Windber Area Elementary School

Entertainment
The nearby Silver Drive-In first opened in 1962. While other such facilities in the area have closed over the course of years, the Silver survived through public outcry over proposals to close and demolish it, making a comeback in 2005.  It is now the only drive-in theater in the Johnstown, Pennsylvania region.

Notable people 
 Jim Bonfanti, drummer for the power-pop band the Raspberries, was born in Windber.
 Bill Elko, professional football player, grew up in Windber.
 Alan Freed, radio disc jockey who coined the term "Rock and Roll," was born in Windber.
 Dave Geisel, retired MLB player
 Mark A. Heckler, President of Valaparaiso University
 Gene Heeter, a professional football player for the New York Jets, was born in Windber.
 Frank Kostro, retired MLB player
 Frank Kush, football coach, was born in Windber.
 Johnny Weissmuller, winner in the 1920s of five Olympic gold medals in swimming and one bronze medal in water polo, and later was a Hollywood star best known for his Tarzan movies, particularly with actress Maureen O'Sullivan, lived in Windber as a child. (He was born in what is now Timișoara, Romania)
 J. Irving Whalley, a former United States congressman and a member of the Automotive Hall of Fame, lived for years in Windber.

See also

 List of boroughs in Pennsylvania
 List of geographic names derived from anagrams and ananyms

References

External links

 Borough website
 Windber Area School District
 

Boroughs in Somerset County, Pennsylvania
Historic American Engineering Record in Pennsylvania
Populated places established in 1897
Company towns in Pennsylvania
Berwind Corporation